Daniel Lawrence Curley (born April 25, 1979) is a former American football tight end and Fullback of the National Football League (NFL). He was drafted by the St. Louis Rams in the fifth round of the 2003 NFL Draft. He played college football at Eastern Washington. He attended Anacortes High School in Anacortes, WA.

Curley was also a member of the New Orleans Saints and Carolina Panthers.

Professional career

References

1979 births
Living people
Players of American football from Tacoma, Washington
American football tight ends
American football fullbacks
Eastern Washington Eagles football players
St. Louis Rams players
New Orleans Saints players
Carolina Panthers players
Cologne Centurions (NFL Europe) players